Bilirubin di-glucuronide is a conjugated form of bilirubin formed in bilirubin metabolism. The hydrophilic character of bilirubin diglucuronide enables it to be water-soluble. It is pumped across the hepatic canalicular membrane into the bile by the transporter MRP2.

See also
Bilirubin mono-glucuronide

References

Metabolism